Sils im Domleschg (Romansh: Seglias) is a municipality in the Viamala Region in the Swiss canton of Graubünden.

History
Sils im Domleschg is first mentioned in 1149 as de Sillas.

Geography

Of this area, about 14.6% is used for agricultural purposes, while 70.4% is forested. Of the rest of the land, 8.2% is settled (buildings or roads) and 6.9% is unproductive land.

Of the agricultural land,  is used for orchards and vineyards,  is fields and grasslands and  consists of alpine grazing areas. Rivers and lakes cover  in the municipality.

Before 2017, the municipality was located in the Domleschg sub-district, of the Hinterrhein district, after 2017 it was part of the Viamala Region.  It is a linear village between the Albula and Hinterrhein rivers.  It consists of the village of Sils im Domleschg and the hamlets of Freihof, Campi and Albula.

Demographics
, 16.3% of the population are resident foreign nationals. In 2015 a small minority (50 or 5.4% of the population) was born in Portugal. Over the last 4 years (2010-2014) the population has changed at a rate of 5.60%. The birth rate in the municipality, in 2014, was 11.0, while the death rate was 5.5 per thousand residents.

, children and teenagers (0–19 years old) make up 21.5% of the population, while adults (20–64 years old) are 58.1% and seniors (over 64 years old) make up 20.3%.  In 2015 there were 365 single residents, 444 people who were married or in a civil partnership, 50 widows or widowers and 68 divorced residents.

In 2014 there were 387 private households in Sils im Domleschg with an average household size of 2.36 persons.  Of the 214 inhabited buildings in the municipality, in 2000, about 50.0% were single family homes and 32.7% were multiple family buildings.  Additionally, about 28.0% of the buildings were built before 1919, while 15.9% were built between 1991 and 2000.  In 2013 the rate of construction of new housing units per 1000 residents was 7.82.  The vacancy rate for the municipality, was 2.37%.

The historical population is given in the following table:

Languages
Most of the population speaks German (86.8%), with Serbo-Croatian being second most common (3.3%) and Italian being third (2.8%).

Heritage sites of national significance

Ehrenfels Castle, Carschenna (pre-historic petroglyphs), the ruins of Hohenrätien Castle and the ruins of Campell or Campi Castle are listed as Swiss heritage sites of national significance.

Politics
In the 2015 federal election the most popular party was the SVP with 35.8% of the vote.  The next three most popular parties were the BDP (20.1%), the SP (15.1%) and the FDP (12.7%).  In the federal election, a total of 287 votes were cast, and the voter turnout was 45.9%.  The 2015 election saw a large change in the voting when compared to 2011.  The percentage of the vote received by the SVP increased from 27.8% in 2011 to 35.8% in 2015, while the percentage that the BDP dropped from 31.1% to 20.1%.

In the 2007 federal election the most popular party was the SVP which received 43.4% of the vote.  The next three most popular parties were the SPS (27.4%), the FDP (19.7%) and the CVP (8.1%).

Education
In Sils im Domleschg about 73.3% of the population (between age 25-64) have completed either non-mandatory upper secondary education or additional higher education (either university or a Fachhochschule).

Economy
Sils im Domleschg is an industrial-tertiary municipality, a municipality where agriculture and manufacturing play a minor role in the economy.

, there were a total of 287 people employed in the municipality.  Of these, a total of 14 people worked in 6 businesses in the primary economic sector.  The secondary sector employed 160 workers in 21 separate businesses.  A minority (25.6%) of the secondary sector employees worked in very small businesses.  There were 5 small businesses with a total of 119 employees.  Finally, the tertiary sector provided 113 jobs in 42 businesses.  In 2014 a total of 7.8% of the population received social assistance.

Religion

Of the rest of the population,  there are 43 individuals (or about 2.03% of the population) who belong to the Orthodox Church, and there are 13 individuals (or about 0.61% of the population) who belong to another Christian church. There are 21 (or about 0.99% of the population) who are Muslim. There was 1 individual (or about 0.05% of the population) who belonged to another church (not listed on the census), 97 (or about 4.57% of the population) who belong to no church, are agnostic or atheist, and 71 individuals (or about 3.35% of the population) who did not answer the question.

References

External links
 Official Web site

 
Municipalities of Graubünden
Cultural property of national significance in Graubünden